German submarine U-963 was a Type VIIC U-boat of Nazi Germany's Kriegsmarine during World War II.

She was ordered on 5 June 1941, and was laid down on 20 April 1942 at Blohm & Voss, Hamburg, as yard number 163. She was launched on 30 December 1942 and commissioned under the command of Leutnant zur See Karl Boddenberg on 17 February 1943.

Design
German Type VIIC submarines were preceded by the shorter Type VIIB submarines. U-963 had a displacement of  when at the surface and  while submerged. She had two shafts and two  propellers.

U-963 was fitted with five  torpedo tubes (four fitted at the bow and one at the stern), fourteen torpedoes or 26 TMA mines, one  SK C/35 naval gun, 220 rounds, and one twin  C/30 anti-aircraft gun. The boat had a complement of between 44 — 52 men.

Service history
U-963 had a recorded five attacks on her. The first two during her fourth war patrol. On 5 February 1944, when she shot down a British B-24 Liberator of 53 Squadron/T RAF. Then on 26 March 1944, off of Brest, France, she came under attack by an unidentified Allied airplane.  This attack left nine men wounded, with two of them being badly injured. U-963 docked at Brest the next day.

Shortly after U-963 left Brest on 7 June 1944, on her fifth war patrol, she came under attack by another British B-24 of 53 Squadron RAF, piloted by John William Carmichael. The bomber was able to damage U-963 so severely that she had to return to Brest less than 24 hours after leaving for her patrol.

On 12 August 1944, the submarine base in Brest was bombed, killing one man during the air raid and severely wounding another, who died the next day.

The last attack came on 21 August 1944, in the Bay of Biscay. Just after midnight U-963 was forced into a crash dive and one man was lost overboard.

On 20 May 1945, the crew of U-963 scuttled her off of Nazaré, Portugal. The entire crew survived.

Wolfpacks
U-963 took part in eight wolfpacks, namely:
 Siegfried (22 – 27 October 1943)
 Siegfried 2 (27 – 30 October 1943)
 Körner (30 October 1943 – 2 November 1943)
 Tirpitz 2 (2 – 8 November 1943)
 Eisenhart 5 (9 – 15 November 1943)
 Igel 2 (3 – 17 February 1944)
 Hai 2 (17 – 22 February 1944)
 Preussen (22 February – 14 March 1944)

References

Bibliography

External links

German Type VIIC submarines
U-boats commissioned in 1943
World War II submarines of Germany
Ships built in Hamburg
1942 ships
Maritime incidents in May 1945
World War II shipwrecks in the Atlantic Ocean